Ole Monty (22 October 1908 – 24 April 1977) was a Danish film actor. He appeared in 65 films between 1937 and 1976.

He was born in Copenhagen, Denmark and died in Denmark.

Filmography

Flådens blå matroser - 1937
Under byens tage - 1938
Den usynlige hær - 1945
Så mødes vi hos Tove - 1946
Bag de røde porte - 1951
Fodboldpræsten - 1951
Vejrhanen - 1952
Solstik - 1953
I kongens klær - 1954
Det var på Rundetårn - 1955
Hvad vil De ha'? - 1956
Taxa K-1640 Efterlyses - 1956
Den store gavtyv - 1956
Vi som går stjernevejen - 1956
Lån mig din kone - 1957
Natlogi betalt - 1957
Andre folks børn - 1958
Vagabonderne på Bakkegården - 1958
Krudt og klunker - 1958
Vi er allesammen tossede - 1959
Sømand i knibe - 1960
Frihedens pris - 1960
Gøngehøvdingen - 1961
Sorte Shara - 1961
Soldaterkammerater på sjov - 1962
Bussen - 1963
Majorens oppasser - 1964
Slottet - 1964
Sommer i Tyrol - 1964
Don Olsen kommer til byen - 1964
Sytten - 1965
En ven i bolignøden - 1965
Mor bag rattet - 1965
Næsbygaards arving - 1965
Krybskytterne på Næsbygaard - 1966
Dyden går amok - 1966
Jeg er sgu min egen - 1967
Lille mand, pas på! - 1968
Soldaterkammerater på bjørnetjeneste - 1968
Min søsters børn vælter byen - 1968
Olsen Banden (film) - 1968
Midt i en jazztid - 1969
Ta' lidt solskin - 1969
Sonja - 16 år - 1969
Mordskab - 1969
Rend mig i revolutionen - 1970
Motorvej på sengekanten - 1972
Romantik på sengekanten - 1973
På'en igen Amalie - 1973
Mig og Mafiaen - 1973
I Tyrens tegn - 1974
Pigen og drømmeslottet - 1974
Piger i trøjen - 1975
Spøgelsestoget - 1976
Familien Gyldenkål sprænger banken - 1976

External links

1908 births
1977 deaths
Danish male film actors
Male actors from Copenhagen
20th-century Danish male actors